Dike Cirque is a semi-circular glacial cirque  wide in the Miller Range of Antarctica. It is carved into the Macdonald Bluffs at the southeast base of Kreiling Mesa. It was so named by the Ohio State University Geological Party, 1967–68, because the granite cliffs surrounding the cirque are cut by numerous black dikes.

References 

Cirques of Antarctica
Landforms of Oates Land